Last to Know may refer to:
"Last to Know", a song by Pink from her 2004 album Try This
"The Last to Know", a song by Sheena Easton from her 1987 album No Sound but a Heart; covered and released as a single by Celine Dion in 1990 from her album Unison
"Last to Know", a song by Three Days Grace from their 2009 album Life Starts Now